The Locus Award for Best Short Story is one of a series of Locus Awards given every year by Locus Magazine. Awards presented in a given year are for works published in the previous calendar year.

Originally known as the Locus Award for Best Short Fiction, the first award in this category was presented in 1971.

Winners

Winners are as follows:

References

Short Story
Short story awards